Jürgen Hartmann (born 1946) is a German political scientist. Since 2011, he has been a professor of political science, especially with respect to comparative politics, at the Helmut Schmidt University in Hamburg.

Life and work
Hartmann published his dissertation in 1976, titled The American President in the related field of Congress fractions: Structures, strategies and implementation problems in the relations of Presidents Kennedy, Johnson and Nixon to majority groups in Congress (1961-1973). In 1982, he wrote "Political profiles of Western European industrial society" habilitation.

At the end of 2011, he was designated as Professor Emeritus.

Areas of research and publications
His research specialty is analysis in the political science sector of society, especially comparative politics. In his academic career, he has written a number of textbooks on this overarching theme. His publications deal largely with international and governmental systems of various kinds, mainly in the western hemisphere.

His latest work was written together with Udo Kempf on Heads of State in a Democracy.

In addition, he worked intensively with the History of Political Science in European-American comparison study, his case is based on the US scale. However, the reduction in the history of the German political science in the period after 1945 by Wilhelm Bleek contained therein as "problematic "in

Literature
 (Ed.),  Manual German Länder  1990 passim
 Politik auf den Trummern der zweiten Welt: Russland, Osteuropa und die asiatische Peripherie, 1998 
 Staatszeremoniell, 2000, 
 Internationale Beziehungen, 2001 
 Geschichte der Politikwissenschaft: Grundzüge der Fachentwicklung in den USA und in Europa, 2003 TB 2006 
 Das politische System der Europäischen Union. Eine Einführung, 2009

References

External links 
 

1946 births
Living people
German political scientists
Academic staff of Helmut Schmidt University